Marco Gebhardt (born 7 October 1972) is a German football manager and former player. He is currently manager of NOFV-Oberliga Nord club Blau-Weiß 90 Berlin.

References

1972 births
Living people
Association football midfielders
German footballers
Germany B international footballers
SC Verl players
Eintracht Frankfurt players
FC Energie Cottbus players
TSV 1860 Munich players
1. FC Saarbrücken players
1. FC Union Berlin players
SV Germania Schöneiche players
Bundesliga players
2. Bundesliga players
3. Liga players
People from Quedlinburg
Footballers from Saxony-Anhalt
German football managers
Dynamo Dresden non-playing staff
Oberliga (football) managers